Henry G. Backstrom (July 31, 1897 – December 17, 1987) was an American politician in the state of Washington. He served in the Washington House of Representatives from 1959 to 1973.

References

1987 deaths
1897 births
Politicians from New Britain, Connecticut
Democratic Party members of the Washington House of Representatives
20th-century American politicians